México has competed at the Special Olympics World Games 11 times.

Medal tallies

Special Olympics World Winter Games

Image:Med_1.png Gold medalists
 2009 Special Olympics World Winter Games
 José Visiconty: Figure Skating Men's Singles Division 6

Image:Med_2.png Silver medalists

Image:Med_3.png Bronze medalists
 2009 Special Olympics World Winter Games
 Brenda Monreal and José Visiconty: Figure Skating Pairs Division 1
 Juan Ruiz: Figure Skating Men's Singles Division 6

Other Results
 2009 Special Olympics World Winter Games
 4th: Mexican mixed Floor hockey team: Floor Hockey Mixed Competition Division I - Lost to Spain for 3rd place
 Team members: Lilia Aguilar, Luis Baca, Saúl Campos, Juan Carrillo, Jesús García, Loreto López, Roberto Manzanares, Armando Murillo, Ever Ochoa, Angel Ortiz, Ever Ortiz, Hector Pacheco, Rosaura Reyes, Luz Rico, Beatriz Rivera and Jorge Sandoval.
 4th: Tomás Arenazas: Figure Skating Men's Singles Division 5
 4th: Brenda Monreal: Figure Skating Women's Singles Division 1
 6th: Alonso Flores: Figure Skating Men's Singles Division 6
 6th: Rosa María Rodríguez: Figure Skating Women's Singles Division 2
 7th: Jenny Arcos: Figure Skating Women's Singles Division 3
 7th: Karen Borges: Figure Skating Women's Singles Division 1

See also
Mexico at the Olympics
Mexico at the Paralympics

External links
 Special Olympics
Olimpiadas Especiales México
2009 World Winter Games website

Special Olympics
Special Olympics